Robert Mormando is an American mafia hitman for the New York Gambino crime family, who later became a government informant.

Mormando was born in Ozone Park, Queens, and is a divorced father of two children. In October 2009, Mormando became the first mobster to admit in open court that he is gay while on trial for the 2003 shooting of bagel store owner, Angelo Mugnolo. Although the mafia ran gay bars and gay night clubs, including the Stonewall Inn, they frowned upon being gay. He had a close personal friendship with Richard G. Gotti, John Gotti's nephew.

References

American gangsters of Italian descent
Gambino crime family
American gay men
Federal Bureau of Investigation informants
Mafia hitmen
Living people
People from Ozone Park, Queens
Year of birth missing (living people)